Carlo Carli may refer to:

 Carlo Carli (Italian politician) (born 1945)
 Carlo Carli (Australian politician) (born 1960)